Demon Lover may refer to:

 The Daemon Lover, a medieval British ballad
 The Daemon Lover, a short story by Shirley Jackson.
 "The Demon Lover", a 1945 short story by Elizabeth Bowen
 "Demon Lover", a 2010 short story by Cecelia Holland
 Demonlover, a 2002 film by Olivier Assayas
 "Demon Lover", a 1970 song by Shocking Blue from their album Scorpio's Dance
 "Demon Lover", a 2009 song Róisín Murphy